Richard "Rick" Gudex (July 23, 1968 – October 12, 2016) was an American manufacturing production manager and Republican politician from Fond du Lac, Wisconsin. He was the former Fond du Lac City Council president, and on November 6, 2012, he defeated incumbent Democrat Jessica King from her seat in the Wisconsin State Senate's 18th District by 590 votes.

Background
According to his campaign biography, Gudex was born in Eden, Wisconsin, in 1968, graduated from St. Mary's Springs High School, and worked full-time for the family business before becoming a shop worker at the Gehl Company, soon becoming a supervisor. As of 2012, he was a production manager at Brenner Tank.

Public office
In 1998, he was living in Mayville, Wisconsin, and was elected the city's Mayor. When he moved back to Eden, he was elected to the Village Board. Gudex and his wife Kim moved to Fond du Lac in 2005; in 2009, he won a seat on the Fond du Lac City Council and was re-elected in 2011. In 2012, he began his third term as President of the Council.

Personal life and death
Gudex was married to Kim; the couple had two children. He was an active member of his Catholic parish and belonged to the Knights of Columbus.

Gudex died on October 12, 2016, aged 48 of a self-inflicted gunshot wound. At the time of his death he had been serving as President pro tempore of the Wisconsin Senate.

State Senator Scott Fitzgerald was quoted as saying "I was deeply saddened to hear this morning of the passing of Senator Rick Gudex. Rick will be deeply missed by his Senate colleagues; our thoughts and prayers are with his family at this difficult time."

References

External links

1968 births
2016 suicides
People from Eden, Wisconsin
Mayors of places in Wisconsin
Wisconsin city council members
Republican Party Wisconsin state senators
American politicians who committed suicide
Suicides by firearm in Wisconsin
21st-century American politicians
People from Mayville, Wisconsin
Catholics from Wisconsin